In directional statistics, the Kent distribution, also known as the 5-parameter Fisher–Bingham distribution (named after John T. Kent, Ronald Fisher, and Christopher Bingham), is a probability distribution on the unit sphere (2-sphere S2 in 3-space R3).  It is the analogue on S2 of the bivariate normal distribution with an unconstrained covariance matrix. The Kent distribution was proposed by John T. Kent in 1982, and is used in geology as well as bioinformatics.

Definition
The probability density function  of the Kent distribution is given by:

The parameter   (with  ) determines the concentration or spread of the distribution, while    (with   ) determines the ellipticity of the contours of equal probability. Vector    is the mean direction, and vectors    are the major and minor axes. The latter two vectors determine the orientation of the equal probability contours on the sphere, while the first vector determines the common center of the contours. The 3×3 matrix  must be orthogonal.

Generalization to higher dimensions

The Kent distribution can be easily generalized to spheres in higher dimensions.

 

See also
 Directional statistics
 Von Mises–Fisher distribution
 Bivariate von Mises distribution
 Von Mises distribution
 Bingham distribution

References
 Boomsma, W., Kent, J.T., Mardia, K.V., Taylor, C.C. & Hamelryck, T. (2006) Graphical models and directional statistics capture protein structure. In S. Barber, P.D. Baxter, K.V.Mardia, & R.E. Walls (Eds.), Interdisciplinary Statistics and Bioinformatics, pp. 91–94. Leeds, Leeds University Press.
 Hamelryck T, Kent JT, Krogh A (2006) Sampling Realistic Protein Conformations Using Local Structural Bias. PLoS Comput Biol 2(9): e131
 Kent, J. T. (1982) The Fisher–Bingham distribution on the sphere., J. Royal. Stat. Soc., 44:71–80.
 Kent, J. T., Hamelryck, T. (2005). Using the Fisher–Bingham distribution in stochastic models for protein structure. In S. Barber, P.D. Baxter, K.V.Mardia, & R.E. Walls (Eds.), Quantitative Biology, Shape Analysis, and Wavelets, pp. 57–60. Leeds, Leeds University Press.
 Mardia, K. V. M., Jupp, P. E. (2000) Directional Statistics (2nd edition), John Wiley and Sons Ltd. 
 Peel, D., Whiten, WJ., McLachlan, GJ. (2001) Fitting mixtures of Kent distributions to aid in joint set identification. J. Am. Stat. Ass., 96:56–63

Directional statistics
Continuous distributions